"Fuiste Mía" is a song recorded by Argentine duo MYA and American duo Ha*Ash. It was released on February 25, 2021 through Sony Music Argentina, as single from MYA's upcoming second studio album. A music video was released alongside the song. The song is described as "power ballad".

Background and release 
"Fuiste Mía" was written by Maxi Espindola, Agustín Bernasconi, Esteban Noguera and Andy Clay and produced by Mapache Producciones. It was confirmed the single on February 22, 2021. "Fuiste Mía" was released for streaming to YouTube on 25 February 2021, and released for digital download a two days later under the same label.

Music video 
A Martin Seipel-directed music video for "Fuiste Mía" was released alongside the song on February 25, 2021.  The video was filmed in isolation during the COVID-19 pandemic in early 2021 at the Houston, Texas by Ha*Ash and at Buenos Aires, Argentina by MYA.

Credits and personnel
Credits adapted from Genius.

 Ashley Grace – lead vocals
 Hanna Nicole – lead vocals
 Maxi Espindola – lead vocals, songwriting, ingeniería de grabación
 Agustín Bernasconi – lead vocals, songwriting
 Esteban Noguera – songwriting
 Andy Clay – songwriting
 Mapache Producciones – production
 Juan Pablo Isaza Piñeros – programming, guitar, keyboards, record engineering
 Pablo Benito Revollo Bueno – programming, guitar, keyboards, record engineering
 Nicolás González Londoño – programming, guitar, keyboards, record engineering, organ B3
 Alan Ortega – record engineering
 Jean Rodríguez – record engineering, vocal engineering (Ha*Ash)
 Curt Schneider - mixing
 Dave Kutch - mastering
 Andrés Torres - drums

Charts

Release history

References 

2021 songs
2021 singles
Ha*Ash songs
Spanish-language songs
Sony Music Latin singles
Pop ballads
2020s ballads